Grant William Basey (born 30 November 1988) is an former professional footballer who played as a left-back. Born in England, he represented Wales internationally at youth levels U17, U19 and U21,

Playing career

Charlton Athletic
Basey joined Charlton's academy, having been spotted on one of the club's community courses, and signed his first professional contract with Charlton in March 2007. 

Basey made his Charlton Athletic debut against Queens Park Rangers on 27 October 2007, where he started and played the whole, in a 1–0 loss. But during a 3–0 loss against Sheffield United on 27 November 2007, he suffered a groin injury that kept him out for several months. Although he was told by the club's management that he's expected to be loaned out, this never happened and stayed. Basey scored his first ever professional goal in the 4–1 victory over Coventry City on 4 May 2008, just three days after signing a new two-year deal keeping him at The Valley until 2010. At the end of the 2007–08 season, he went on to make nine appearances and scoring once.

Ahead of the 2008–09 season, Basey was expected to fight for a first team place by Manager Alan Pardew. Basey did make a good start in the opening game of the season when he set up a goal for Andy Gray from a free-kick, just several minutes coming on as a second-half substitute, in a 2–0 win over Swansea City. However, Basey lost his first team place and never played again from February onward, which saw the club relegated to League One.

Following the club's relegation, Basey didn't make an appearance until on 3 October 2009, where he came on as a late substitute, in a 0–0 draw against Leeds United. Then, Basey then provided assists six times this season against Bristol Rovers, Brighton & Hove Albion, Stockport County, Millwall, Swindon Town and Hartlepool United. All of six matches Basey assisted were a win and draw. However, in a 2–1 loss Bristol Rovers on 15 February 2010, he suffered an ankle ligament damage in the early-first half. Although "it was bad as it feared", Basey, however, was ruled for the rest of the 2009–10 season.

In July 2010, Basey returned to the club's first team in the pre-season from injury.

Brentford (loan)
At the start of the 2007–08 season he had a three-month spell on loan at Brentford and making his debut in the opening game of the season, in a 1–1 draw against Mansfield Town. Despite extending his loan spell at Brentford for another month, he went on to make ten appearances for Brentford - eight of which were in the league - before returning to his parent club in mid-October 2007.

Barnet
After spending time on trial at Aberdeen, Basey signed for League Two club Barnet on a four-month contract. It came after when Basey would not return to Charlton.

He made his debut in the centre of defence alongside Clovis Kamdjo in the 2–0 victory over Hereford United on 2 October 2010. However, in the next game, on 9 October 2010, with a 2–0 loss against Bradford City, Basey suffered ankle injury in the early-second half. After three weeks on the sidelines, he returned to the first team against Stevenage on 2 November 2010, which saw Barnet lose 3–0. Several weeks after returning to the first team, Basey scored his first Barnet goal, in a 4–0 win over Northampton Town on 20 November 2010. From that moment on, Basey continued to be in the first team regular for the side until his departure, making thirteen appearances and scoring once for the side.

On 6 January 2011, Basey had his contract with Barnet terminated by temporary manager Paul Fairclough after his dedication to the club had been questioned.

Peterborough United
Basey joined Peterborough United on 21 January 2011 on a contract until the end of the season.

However, Basey spent five matches as an unused substitute after joining the club. But was given a first team chance following the club's defensive crisis. He made his debut on 15 February 2011 in the 2–0 victory away at Yeovil Town, and scored Peterborough's second as they look to climb up the League One table. Three days later, he signed a contract extension with Peterborough, keeping him at the club until the end of the 2011–12 season. Although he returned to the substitute bench later on, Basey appeared in the first team several times before being sidelined for the rest of the season with a knee injury.

Following the club's promotion to the Championship, Basey played three times for the side in the 2011–12 season, playing in the left-back. However, Basey lost his first place in the left-back to Craig Alcock.

Wycombe Wanderers
After Peterborough United's failed attempt to get Basey leave the club in the summer transfer window, Basey subsequently moved to Wycombe Wanderers initially on loan.

Two days after signing for the club, Basey made his Wycombe Wanderers debut on 8 October 2011, where he played and started the whole game, in a 1–1 draw against Walsall. After making five appearances since joining the club, his loan spell at Wycombe Wanderers was extended until the end of December. Just he was about to return to his parent club, he signed a permanent contract with the club, keeping him until the end of the 2012–13 season. Basey then provided two assists on 25 February 2012, in a 5–0 win over Hartlepool United. After returning to the first team from injury at a car accident, he went on to score two more goals as the 2011–12 season progressed, against Stevenage and Notts County At the end of the 2011–12 season, which saw Wycombe Wanderers relegated back to League Two, Basey went on to make thirty-three appearances and scoring two times in all competitions.

However, in the 2012–13 season, Basey appeared four times at the start of the season in all competitions before being sidelined for the rest of the season after rupturing his anterior cruciate ligament in training. At the end of the 2012–13 season, Basey was released by the club. During his time there, he made 35 appearances over two seasons.

Ebbsfleet United
After leaving Wycombe Wanderers, Basey joined Ebbsfleet United on 1 October 2013. He made his Ebbsfleet United debut on 29 October 2013, in a 1–0 loss against Dartford. Although he made another appearance for Ebbsfleet United, his brief spell at Ebbsfleet United, however, was cut short by injury.

VCD Athletic
Basey resumed his playing career at VCD Athletic.

Cray Wanderers
Basey joined Cray Wanderers in July 2015. He was voted Supporters' Player of the Year in his first season at Cray. Having attempted a comeback after a serious injury, sustained in an FA Cup tie at Faversham Town, had sidelined him for a long period, Basey announced his retirement from playing in February 2017.

International career
Despite being born in England, Basey chose to represent Wales, qualifying for the Welsh set-up on account of his grandmother being born in Cardiff. Basey was also previously called up for the Wales U17 and Wales U19.

He was selected for the Welsh Under-21s squad for a 3–2 loss to Israel in 2007. Basey received another call up to the Wales squad for the friendly match against England on 15 May 2008. Given the number 12 shirt, he was an unused substitute in his team's 2–0 loss at Wrexham's Racecourse Ground. It wasn't until on 27 March 2009 when he made his Wales U21 debut, making his first start and playing the whole game, in a 0–0 draw against Luxembourg U21.

Coaching career

Charlton Athletic
Basey was the Charlton Athletic Kit Manager between 2018 and 2019 before being promoted to First Team Development Coach, providing a link between the first team and the club's academy.

Cray Wanderers
On 31 December 2021, Basey was named interim manager of former-club Cray Wanderers.

On 22 March 2022, Basey was replaced by Neil Smith as manager of Cray Wanderers.

VCD Athletic
On 19 May 2022, Basey was named as manager for VCD Athletic.

On 18 February 2023, Basey resigned as manager following a 2–0 defeat at home to Whitehawk.

Personal life
He lives in Chislehurst and attended Red Hill Primary School in Chislehurst before attending Coopers Technology College for his secondary education.

Basey took part in the 2016 London Marathon to raise money for the Institute of Cancer Research after losing his mother to bowel cancer. He also took part the previous year.

He was the Charlton Athletic Kit Manager between 2018 and 2019 before being promoted to First Team Development Coach, providing a link between the first team and the club's academy.

Career statistics

Managerial statistics

References

External links
Grant Basey player profile at cafc.co.uk

1988 births
Living people
Footballers from Farnborough, London
English footballers
Welsh footballers
Wales youth international footballers
Wales under-21 international footballers
Association football defenders
Charlton Athletic F.C. players
Brentford F.C. players
Barnet F.C. players
Peterborough United F.C. players
Wycombe Wanderers F.C. players
Ebbsfleet United F.C. players
VCD Athletic F.C. players
Cray Wanderers F.C. players
English Football League players
National League (English football) players
Isthmian League players
English football managers
Cray Wanderers F.C. managers
Isthmian League managers